Alfredo Cariello (born 10 September 1979) is an Italian footballer

Football career
Cariello started his career at Salernitana Calcio 1919, one of the largest club in Campania, just behind S.S.C. Napoli. He was loaned to Nocerina and Savoia, also in Campania. He then joined Taranto and Giulianova in January 2003.

Chievo
He was spotted by Chievo in January 2004, which the club keen on signing players in lower league and loaned out to ensure there was good players in squad when relegated. He was loan back to Giulianova for the rest of 2003–04 season.

He played for Frosinone Calcio in second half of 2004–05 season, and played his first Serie A season at Ascoli in 2005-06 along with Francesco Carbone, in co-ownership deal with Chievo for €500 and €20,000 respectively. Chievo bought back both players for an undisclosed fee.

On 26 August 2006, he was sold to F.C. Crotone in co-ownership deal, for €50,000 but bought back by Chievo in June 2007 for around €4,000.

Frosinone 
Cariello was sold to Frosinone in another co-ownership bid on 6 July 2007, Chievo also acquired half of the "card" of Gennaro Troianiello as part of the deal. Both players were valued €360,000, thus 50% registration rights "worth" €180,000 each. Cariello picked no.11 as his shirt number. In June 2008 Cariello joined Frosinone outright for another €180,000.

Late career
In 2011 Cariello left for Lega Pro Seconda Divisione (ex–Serie C2) club Turris Neapolis. In 2012, he left for Serie D club Pomigliano.

References

External links
 AIC profile (data by football.it) 
 La Gazzetta dello Sport (2005–06) profile 

1979 births
Living people
Italian footballers
Taranto F.C. 1927 players
U.S. Salernitana 1919 players
Ascoli Calcio 1898 F.C. players
Frosinone Calcio players
F.C. Crotone players
A.C. ChievoVerona players
Serie A players
Association football midfielders